List of Australian films of 1994 contains a detailed list of films created in Australia in 1994.

1994

See also 
 1994 in Australia
 1994 in Australian television

References

External links 
 Australian film at the Internet Movie Database

1994
Lists of 1994 films by country or language
Films